Joel Herschel Williams (March 18, 1926 – March 10, 1997) was an American football center in the National Football League for the Baltimore Colts.  He also played in the All-America Football Conference for the San Francisco 49ers.  Williams played college football at the University of Texas and was drafted in the 22nd round of the 1948 NFL Draft by the Washington Redskins.

External links
Just Sports Stats

1926 births
1997 deaths
People from San Angelo, Texas
Players of American football from Texas
American football centers
Canadian football offensive linemen
American players of Canadian football
Texas Longhorns football players
San Francisco 49ers (AAFC) players
Baltimore Colts (1947–1950) players
Edmonton Elks players
Hamilton Tiger-Cats players
San Francisco 49ers players